HC Khimik Moscow Oblast may refer to:
Atlant Moscow Oblast, for 1998–2008
Khimik Voskresensk (2005–), for 2011–current